A chief information governance officer (CIGO) is a senior executive of a business, organization or government entity who oversees the management and coordination of all information on an enterprise-wide scale. Unlike a chief marketing officer or chief technology officer, whose roles focus on narrower areas, the CIGO is in charge of implementing, facilitating, and improving information governance strategies across all facets of an organization. The CIGO helps other executives make decisions based on the values, costs, and risks associated with information.

History and evolution 
In past decades, information governance responsibilities might have fallen under the purview of the chief information officer (CIO). But somewhere along the line, the CIO job description changed to focus solely on the information systems and associated technology that power a company—not the information itself.

In today's age of big data, organizations have more information under their control than ever before. To extract the maximum value from that data while simultaneously protecting an organization from its associated risks, business leaders have turned toward the CIGO because of the role's independence from other departments. CIGOs are tasked with neutrally balancing the needs of all departments with respect to an entire organization's top priorities.

Though the position is an emerging one, support for the CIGO continues to rise as business leaders increasingly understand the implications of information governance (and more importantly, the lack thereof). While many organizations have information governance projects in place, such initiatives are much more likely to succeed with top-down management.

Responsibilities 
Since the CIGO is a relatively new position, the role's responsibilities are not set in stone and continue to evolve. For the most part, today's CIGOs:
 Manage all of an organization's information, tapping into as much value from it as possible (e.g., better-targeted marketing) while reducing exposure to its associated risks (e.g., lawsuits) 
 Coordinate information governance efforts across all stakeholders within an organization 
 Prioritize the information-related needs of all departments 
 Advocate for those needs on behalf of relevant stakeholders 
 Collaborate with the various information governance facets to continually improve processes 
 Identify and execute information-related synergies 
 Expunge non-critical data

Events 
Information Governance Initiative 

On May 20–21, 2015, the hosted the first annual CIGO Summit in Chicago, Illinois.

 Compliance Governance Oversight Council (CGOC) Regional Meetings
 Regional meetings are held twice a year throughout USA and in Europe  for legal, IT, records and CIGO professionals.

Notable CIGO examples 
 JoAnn Stonier, Chief Information Governance & Privacy Officer, MasterCard

See also 

 Data science
 Electronic discovery
 Records management
 Information governance

References

External links 
 CIGO Summit